Italcementi is an  Italian multinational company, quoted on the Borsa Italiana, which produces cement, ready-mix concrete and construction aggregates. In 2015, 45% of Italcementi was acquired by HeidelbergCement, together forming the world's second largest cement producer.

History 
Italcementi was founded in 1846 in Scanzo near Bergamo, Italy, as the Società Bergamasca per la fabbricazione del cemento e della calce idraulica (Bergamo Company for the production of cement and hydraulic lime). The company produced a new grade of cement, the Scanzo cement, that grew in popularity and was used in various projects such as the 16-arches bridge above the Adda river, the Venezia Santa Lucia railway station and the Suez Canal (underwater concrete).

In the early 1920s, the company merged with the construction group owned by the Pesenti family, forming a 12-plant and 1500-employee  group producing +200 tons of cement annually. In 1925, it was introduced on the Italian stock exchange. The company became Italcementi in 1927. In the fifties, Italcementi provided the cement for the construction of the Pirelli Tower.

In 1992, it underwent internationalisation following the acquisition of Ciments Français, which made it the largest cement producer of the world. Since 1998, it has further expanded through acquisitions of new cement works in Bulgaria, Kazakhstan, Thailand, Morocco, India, Egypt, Kuwait, and the United States.

In 2010, Ciments français bought its obligations back from its US creditors to pave the way for a merger with its parent company Italcementi, merger that had previously faced a strong opposition from the aforementioned US stakeholders. In June 2014, Italcementi, already an 83% shareholder in Ciments français, launched a bid to buy the remaining 17%. By the end of the takeover bid in July 2014, Italcementi reached 97,73% participation in Ciments français, and remained confident it would reach the 100% threshold.

During the World Expo in Shanghai in 2010, Italcementi introduced the first transparent cement (trademarked as i.light) using thermoplastic polymer resin inserted in the special cement mixture. In 2007, Italcementi introduced a new cement that retains smog with enhanced titanium dioxyde. In 2015, Italcementi introduced a smog-purifying biodynamic cement with photocatalytic properties : it converts polluants contained in the outside air into inert salts.

In July 2015, German construction group HeidelbergCement (world’s 4th cement producer), agreed to buy a 45% stake in Italcementi (world’s 5th cement producer) for $1.85 billion from the Pesenti family (through the family's holding group, Italmobiliare), thus creating the world's 2nd largest cement producer. As a trade-off, the Pesenti family gets 5% of the newly formed group, making them the second largest shareholders after the Merckle family In May 2016, the European commission approved the deal. The acquisition led to 400 lay-offs of Italcementi employees in Italy. The deal was announced a week after Lafarge merged with Holcim, and amid rumors that Dangote Cement was eyeing an acquisition of Italcementi.

On 12 October 2016, HeidelbergCement purchased the remaining Italcementi shares. Therefore, HeidelbergCement is now the sole shareholder of Italcementi and owns 100% of the share capital.

Activity 
The Italcementi Group is based in the town of Bergamo, in northern Italy. It has a staff of more than 20,000 employees, of which 400 are engaged in technical support and research activities under the group company C.T.G SpA (CTG stands for 'Centro Tecnico di Gruppo). Italcementi's annual sales are over 6 billion euros.

Italcementi is implemented in 22 countries: Albania, Belgium, Bulgaria, China, Canada, Cyprus, Egypt, France, Gambia, Greece, India, Italy, Kazakhstan, Kuwait, Morocco, Mauritania, Saudi Arabia, Spain, Sri Lanka, Thailand, Turkey and the United States.

Over 60% of its sales come from the cement sector which is combined with the production of ready-mixed concrete and aggregates.

It boasts of a global network including 62 cement plants
(cement + clinker 54 MT), 12 grinding centers, 4 terminals.
(one of which is also a grinding center), 570 concrete batching units (20.8 million cubic metres) and 152 quarries aggregate quarries (56.7 MT).

Italcementi is controlled by Italmobiliare, based in Milan and quoted on the Borsa Italiana. The whole group has been controlled by the Italian Pesenti family since its foundation in 1864.

See also

List of Italian companies

References

External links

Cement companies of Italy
Companies based in Bergamo
Companies established in 1864
Italian companies established in 1864
Multinational companies headquartered in Italy
Conglomerate companies of Italy
Italian brands